Herbert P. Ginsburg is Jacob H. Schiff Foundation Professor of Psychology & Education at Teachers College, Columbia University. 

He is a leading interpreter of children's understanding of mathematics, with research and teaching interests in intellectual development, mathematics education, and testing and assessment. He is a co-author of the Big Math for Little Kids curriculum for prekindergarten and kindergarten.

He received a Ph.D. and an M.S. in Developmental Psychology from the University of North Carolina, and a B.A. from Harvard University.

External links 
 Faculty Emeritus Bio
 Big Math for Little Kids

Teachers College, Columbia University faculty
Living people
Harvard University alumni
University of North Carolina at Chapel Hill alumni
Year of birth missing (living people)